Ijazat is a Pakistani television series premiered on ARY Digital on 6 May 2010. It is produced by Samina Humayun Saeed and Shehzad Naseeb under banner Six Sigma Plus and directed by Misbah Khalid. Humayun Saeed and Ayesha Khan played the lead roles in the series.

Plot 
The story revolves around a happily married couple, Hamza and Muqadas. Muqadas is a loving wife and daughter-in-law. Her husband Hamza who is a struggling actor also loves her. Hamaz's life changes when he encounters a woman, Nijaat who is eager to join the showbiz industry. She is married to a simple looking yet wealthy man. After an extramarital affair with Hamza, she divorces her husband and marries him. At the end, Muqadas also divorces Hamaz and he is left alone with his guilt.

Cast 
 Humayun Saeed
 Ayesha Khan
 Sadia Imam
 Sakina Samo
 Rashid Farooqui
 Qaiser Naqvi
 Akbar Subhani
 Hassan Niazi
 Munawar Saeed

Accolades

References 

ARY Digital original programming
Pakistani television series